Oscar Spirescu (1874 – September 7, 1918) was a Romanian conductor, composer and pianist who killed himself in 1918.

Biography
Spirescu was born in Bucharest, Romania. He was married and had four children in Romania. He emigrated from Romania to the United States and married for a second time.

In Romania, he was the conductor of the Romanian Opera Orchestra in Bucharest; in the US he became conductor of the Strand Symphony Orchestra at the Strand Theatre in Manhattan.

He killed himself on September 7, 1918, with chloroform in Manhattan. He died intestate and his estate was valued at $3,000.

References

1874 births
1918 suicides
Drug-related suicides in New York City
Deaths from chloroform
Romanian emigrants to the United States
Suicides in New York City
Drug-related deaths in New York City